The 2004 Kansas Jayhawks football team represented the University of Kansas in the 2004 NCAA Division I-A football season.  They were coached by Mark Mangino and played their home games at Memorial Stadium in Lawrence, KS.

Schedule

References

Kansas
Kansas Jayhawks football seasons
Kansas Jayhawks football